may refer to:
 Quintus Arrius (praetor 73 BC), Ancient Roman official
 , a fictional character in the novel Ben-Hur: A Tale of the Christ and various adaptations